Azizah Y. al-Hibri (born 1943) is an American philosopher and legal scholar who specializes in Islam and law.

Biography
Al-Hibri is professor emerita at the T. C. Williams School of Law, University of Richmond. She is a former professor of philosophy, founding editor of Hypatia: A Journal of Feminist Philosophy, and founder and president of KARAMAH: Muslim Women Lawyers for Human Rights. A Fulbright scholar, she has written extensively about Islam and democracy, Muslim women's rights, and human rights in Islam. She was an adviser to the PBS documentary Muhammad: Legacy of a Prophet (2002), produced by Unity Productions Foundation.

Al-Hibri is a member of the advisory board of various organizations, including the Pew Forum on Religion in Public Life, the Pluralism Project Harvard University, and Religion & Ethics Newsweekly (PBS). She is also a member of the Constitution Project's Liberty and Security Committee. In June 2011, al-Hibri was appointed by President Barack Obama to serve as a commissioner on the U.S. Commission on International Religious Freedom.

She also wrote the third chapter of Transforming the Faiths of our Fathers: Women who Changed American Religion (2004), edited by Ann Braude.

Al-Hibri is the grandchild of Sheik Toufik El Hibri who established the first Scout movement in the Arab world.

Sources 
"Shattering the Stereotypes: Muslim Women Speak Out" (2005)

References

External links
Homepage of Azizah Y. al-Hibri
KARAMAH: Muslim Women Lawyers for Human Rights
Op-Ed: Obama's Bridge to Islam

1943 births
American people of Lebanese descent
Philosophy academics
Feminist studies scholars
American Islamic studies scholars
University of Richmond faculty
Harvard University people
Living people
Academic journal editors
Women scholars of Islam
Constitution Project
University of Pennsylvania Law School alumni
American feminists
Proponents of Islamic feminism
Fulbright alumni
Muslim scholars of Islamic studies